"Call Me Baby" is a song recorded by South Korean–Chinese boy band Exo, as the lead single of their second studio album Exodus. It was released on March 27, 2015, through SM Entertainment, in both Korean and Chinese.

The song peaked at number two on South Korea's Gaon Digital Chart, and Billboards World Digital Songs chart in the United States. Its entry at number 98 on the Canadian Hot 100, made Exo the only K-pop act other than Psy to rank on the charts in that territory at the time. "Call Me Baby" ended 2015 as the seventh best-performing song overall in South Korea, and Billboard ranked it as the ninth best K-pop song of the year.

By September 2016, "Call Me Baby" had sold over 1.2 million copies domestically. In 2019, Billboard included it on its list of the 100 greatest K-pop songs of the 2010s, at number 12.

Release and promotion
To promote the release of Exodus, a series of videos referred to as "Pathcode", featuring one Exo member each and are set in various locations, were released on YouTube. The first letters of these locations' names—Colorado, Arizona, London, Lyon, Marseille, Edinburgh, Barcelona, Almaty, Berlin and Yunnan—would spell "Call Me Baby", the title of the album's lead single. It was released digitally on March 27, 2015, three days ahead of the album. Exo began performing the song on South Korean music TV shows on April 2, 2015. After the press conference for the album's release, member Tao was absent from promotional activities and would later withdraw from the group, making "Call Me Baby" the last Exo single he participated in.

Music video
The Korean and Chinese music videos for "Call Me Baby" were released on March 30, 2015. The videos mainly feature Exo's performances of the song at a warehouse setting and against a white backdrop, and were filmed in a one shot style. The Korean version later became the third most-watched K-pop music video on YouTube in 2015.

On September 23, 2018, the Korean music video surpassed 200 million views on YouTube, becoming their second music video to do so.

Reception
Writing for Billboard, Jeff Benjamin commented that while "Call Me Baby" "sounds wholly inspired by the late '90s/early '00s sound", Exo "is not only bringing in the nostalgic feel, but doing it at a 200 percent intensity." The song reached number two on both South Korea's Gaon Digital Chart and the Billboard World Digital Songs chart. It also entered the Canadian Hot 100 at number 98, making Exo the second South Korean artist, after Psy, to appear on the chart. "Call Me Baby" went on to win first place 18 times in total on South Korean music TV shows for the entire month, and the all-time second highest number of wins. Billboard ranked the song at number 9 on their list of top 20 K-pop songs of 2015.

Credits and personnel
Credits are adapted from album liner notes.

Exo – vocals
Jo Yoon-kyung – songwriting
January 8th – songwriting
Kim Dong-hyun – songwriting
Teddy Riley – songwriting
DOM – songwriting
Lee Hyun-seung – songwriting
Jason J. Lopez – songwriting
Dantae Johnson – songwriting
Maxx Song – vocal directing, recording, editing
Jung Eui-seok – recording
Lee Ji-hong – editing
Jin Nam-koong – mixing

Charts

Weekly charts

Year-end charts

Sales

Accolades

References

External links

Exo songs
Korean-language songs
2015 singles
2015 songs
SM Entertainment singles